Leïla Chaibi (born 5 October 1982) is a French politician of Tunisian origin who was elected as a Member of the European Parliament in 2019.

Early life and education

Leïla Chaibi graduated from the Institute of Political Studies of Toulouse. She then gets closer to militant networks fond of symbolic modes of action with strong media resonance, such as  She is one of the founders of the collective l'Appel et la Pioche, known especially for

Political career

Long apart from classical political organizations, she joined the New Anticapitalist Party in 2009, when that party was founded, alongside Olivier Besancenot. She left this party in February 2011 to join the Left Party and became the Left Party's national secretary for the abolition of the precariat.

As a member of the Left Party's National Campaign Council for the 2012 Presidential Election, she coached Jean-Luc Mélenchon for the occupation of the rating agency Moody's.

In 2012, she was a candidate in the legislative elections in the 10th constituency of Paris. For the 2014 municipal elections, she was the candidate of the Left Party for the mayor of the 14th arrondissement of Paris.

In 2016, she took part in Nuit debout. In 2017, she was a candidate in the legislative elections in the 10th constituency of Paris for La France insoumise. She was on the ballot in the first round with 14.62% of the vote, in 2nd place, and she was beaten in the 2nd round with 39.89% of the votes.

During the 2019 European Parliament election, she was in third place on La France Insoumise's list of candidates.

References

1982 births
Living people
Politicians from Dijon
French people of Algerian descent
MEPs for France 2019–2024
21st-century women MEPs for France
La France Insoumise MEPs